The Fuel for Life Tour was a 1986 concert tour by English heavy metal band Judas Priest, to support their album Turbo.

Recordings
The band's second live album Priest...Live! and their DVD set Electric Eye feature performances recorded at The Omni, Atlanta, Georgia on 15 June 1986 and the Reunion Arena, Dallas, Texas on 27 June 1986. The 30th anniversary edition of Turbo, released in 2017, features a 2-disc live recorded performance from the 22 May 1986 show at Sandstone Amphitheater in Bonner Springs, Kansas. 
Other official live recordings include "Desert Plains" (Point of Entry bonus track), "Locked In" (Turbo bonus track), "Hell Bent for Leather" (Priest... Live! bonus track), "Private Property" ("Parental Guidance" b-side) and "Love Bites" (Metalogy), all recorded at Kiel Auditorium, St. Louis, Missouri, on 23 May 1986.

The video documentary Heavy Metal Parking Lot was recorded prior to the Judas Priest concert at the Capital Centre, on 31 May 1986.

Production
The stage design featured several platforms resembling futuristic, sleek, mechanical parts. At the back of the stage was a large robot prop with mechanical arms that would lift the band's guitarists and Rob Halford during performances.

During the North American leg of the tour, the band had hired a drum technician, Jonathan Valen, to operate electronic drumming equipment and a sample trigger for backing vocals and some guitar effects. Due to the limitations of technology at the time, these devices required a person to operate them manually.

Setlist
The average setlist was as follows. The setlist predominantly featured songs released in the 1980s, particularly omitting all pre-Killing Machine material, except "Victim of Changes". On early US dates, the Turbo song "Hot for Love" and Point of Entry's "Desert Plains" were performed, while "Parental Guidance" was omitted. The Fuel For Life tour also included some of the few Judas Priest shows where "Victim of Changes" was left off the set list.

"Out in the Cold"
"Locked In"
"Heading Out to the Highway"
"Metal Gods"
"Breaking the Law"
"Love Bites"
"Some Heads Are Gonna Roll"
"The Sentinel"
"Hot For Love" (Dropped after May 12, 1986)
"Private Property"
"Desert Plains" (Replaced by "Parental Guidance" after August 12, 1986)
"Rock You All Around the World"
"The Hellion / Electric Eye"
"Turbo Lover"
"Freewheel Burning"
"Victim of Changes"
"The Green Manalishi (With the Two Prong Crown)"
"Living After Midnight"
"You've Got Another Thing Comin'"
"Hell Bent for Leather"
On the last night of the tour "Screaming For Vengeance" and "Diamonds And Rust" were also played.

Tour dates
The venues and events of the tour were located in North America, Europe and, Japan. They were supported by Dokken on the American leg, Bon Jovi on the Canadian tour dates from 14 to 27 July, Krokus on 6 and 8 August, Loudness on 31 August, and Warlock on the European leg.

Boxscore

Personnel
 Rob Halford – lead vocals
 Glenn Tipton – guitar
 K.K. Downing – guitar
 Ian Hill – bass
 Dave Holland – drums
 Jonathan Valen – electric drummer technician (American leg)
 Jim Silvia – tour manager
 Mick Double – production manager
 Patricia La Magna – production assistant (American leg)
 Jayne Andrews – production assistant (European leg)
 Tom McPhillips – stage design

References

1986 concert tours
Judas Priest concert tours